Legend High School is a public high school in Parker, Colorado. It is part of the Douglas County School District RE-1. It is the first high school to be located in Parker since Parker High School closed in 1958.

Campus
Legend High School is located at the northeast corner of the intersection of Hilltop Road and Canterberry Parkway, the entrance to the Parker neighborhood of Idyllwilde. It is an open campus school to freshmen, sophomores, juniors, and seniors. Cimarron Middle School is located adjacent to the Legend High School campus.

Athletics 
The varsity athletic programs at Legend include football, volleyball, wrestling, soccer, lacrosse, baseball, tennis, softball, swim, cheer, poms, gymnastics, golf, track, rugby, and cross country. The school's teams compete in the 5A Continental League of the Colorado High School Athletics Association (CHSAA).

The 2012-2013 basketball team made it to the Final Four in 5A state playoffs, the fastest ascent to the Final Four in Colorado Big School history.

The 2012-2013 baseball team were 5A state runner-ups.

The 2013 rugby team were Division III state champions. 

The 2015 and 2018 rugby teams were Division II runner-ups. The 2021 rugby team were Division I runner-ups. 

The 2017 softball team won the 5A Colorado high school state championships on the 21st October 2017 against Fossil Ridge, winning 9-3. This was the first time a Legend team won a state championship.

The 2018 softball team won the 5A Colorado high school state championships on the 20th October 2018 against Cherokee Trail, winning 8-4, claiming the school's second state championship.

EDGE Program 
The Legend High School EDGE Program is a non traditional education pathway offered to students of Legend High School in Parker, Colorado.  Consisting of project based learning, students in the program create interdisciplinary projects each academic quarter and present them to parents and community members for feedback, Students are also able to pursue hobbies, passions, and possible future careers as they build projects, and are frequently required to travel outside the classroom for real world experiences.

Legend TSA 
Legend High School currently Participates in the Technology Student Association and competes annually in district, state, and national competitions. In 2018, 12 events from Legend placed in State competitions, with one event, Software Development, placing 9th at the nationals level in Atlanta, Georgia.

Notable alumni
Bobby Dalbec, baseball player
Chad Muma, football player
Derrick White, basketball player

References

External links

School district website

Schools in Douglas County, Colorado
Educational institutions established in 2008
Public high schools in Colorado
Parker, Colorado
2008 establishments in Colorado